Garra manipurensis is a species of ray-finned fish in the genus Garra which is endemic to Manipur.

References 

Garra
Fish described in 1988